Peter Shire (born 1947) is a Los Angeles-based artist.  Shire was born in the Echo Park district of Los Angeles, where he currently lives and works. His sculpture, furniture and ceramics have been exhibited in the United States, Italy, France, Japan and Poland. His work includes a sculpture in Elysian Park to honor the work done by Grace Simons and Peter Glass which kept the park open as green space.

Shire has been associated with the Memphis Group of designers, has worked on the Design Team for the 1984 Summer Olympics with the American Institute of Architects, and has designed public sculptures in Los Angeles and other California cities. Shire has been honored by awards for his contribution to the cultural life of the City of Los Angeles.

In 2019, Shire's work was showcased at the Museum of Contemporary Art in Tucson, Arizona.

Further reading
A Neglected History: 20th Century American Craft. New York, New York: American Craft Museum, 1990.
Clark, Garth. American Ceramics 1907–Present. New York, New York: Abbeville Press, 1987.
Domergue, Denise. Artists Design Furniture. New York, New York: Harry N. Abrams, 1984.
Fiell, Charlotte and Peter. 1000 Chairs. Italy: Taschen, 2000.
Herman, Lloyd E. Art that Works. Seattle, Washington: University of Washington Press, 1990.
Horn, Richard. Memphis: Objects, Furniture, and Patterns. Philadelphia, Pennsylvania: Running Press, 1983.
Radice, Barbara. Memphis. New York, New York: Rizzoli International Publications, 1984.
Taragin, Davara S. Contemporary Crafts and Saxe Collection, The Toledo Museum of Oranges. New York, New York: Hudson Hills Press, 1993.
Tempest in a Teapot: The Ceramic Art of Peter Shire. New York, New York: Rizzoli International Publications, 1991.

References

External links
Peter Shire biography and list of exhibitions
Memphis-Milano design by Shire

1947 births
Living people
American artists
Artists from California
Public art
Art in Greater Los Angeles